The Halberstadt C.I was a German single-engined reconnaissance biplane of World War I, built by Halberstädter Flugzeugwerke.

Design
The Halberstadt C.I was designed in late 1916 as a reconnaissance derivative of the company's B.II equipped with an Oberusel U.1 rotary engine. The aircraft's armament consisted of two front 7.92-mm machine gun LMG 08/15 Spandau and one turret 7.92-mm machine gun Parabellum mounted in the rear cockpit on a mobile turret.

Operators

Luftstreitkrafte

Specifications

See also

References

Military aircraft of World War I
1910s German military reconnaissance aircraft
C.I
Single-engined tractor aircraft
Biplanes
Aircraft first flown in 1917